Sakatovo (Saqat) is a rural locality (a village) in Kamyshlytamaksky Selsoviet, Bakalinsky District, Bashkortostan, Russia. The population was 204 as of 2010. There are 4 streets.

Geography 
Sakatovo is located 20 km southwest of Bakaly (the district's administrative centre) by road. Kamyshlytamak is the nearest rural locality.

References 

Rural localities in Bakalinsky District